Wenatchee Valley Mall is a shopping mall located in East Wenatchee, Washington. It opened in 1973 and is anchored by Bed Bath & Beyond, Macy's, Ross Dress For Less, and Sportsman's Warehouse.

However, despite its small size, Wenatchee Valley Mall is the only mall within an  radius of East Wenatchee, and thus serves a population of over 200,000 people.

History
The mall opened in 1973 with Sears (1973), Lamonts (2nd phase), and Buttrey-Osco Food & Drug. The Bon Marché had planned to add a store at Wenatchee Valley Mall as early as 1996; however, the store did not open until taking the former Buttrey building in 2001. This store became Bon-Macy's in 2003, and Macy's in 2005. Gottschalks, which replaced Lamonts in 2000, closed in 2005, and was replaced with Bed Bath & Beyond and Ross Dress For Less.

Sears closed in 2013 and its building was sold to Sportsman's Warehouse the same year. In turn, Sears opened a smaller-format store.

References

External links
Wenatchee Valley Mall Official Website

Shopping malls in Washington (state)
Shopping malls established in 1973
Buildings and structures in Douglas County, Washington
Tourist attractions in Douglas County, Washington
Wenatchee, Washington
1973 establishments in Washington (state)
Namdar Realty Group